On December 27, 1832, two years after the organization of the Church of Christ, the movement's founder, Joseph Smith, stated he received a revelation that called upon church members to restore the practice of temple worship. The Latter Day Saints in Kirtland, Ohio were commanded to:

The Kirtland Temple was the first temple of the Latter Day Saint movement and the only temple completed in Smith's lifetime. Its unique design was replicated on a larger scale with the Nauvoo Temple and in subsequent temples built by the LDS Church. As the needs of the church have changed, so has temple architecture—from large castellic structures adorned with celestial symbols, to smaller, simpler designs, often derived from a standard set of plans.

Kirtland Temple

The Kirtland Temple, built in Kirtland, Ohio, was not designed as a church or cathedral. It was a house of learning, where the School of the Prophets could meet. This temple was not built to accommodate the endowment ceremony, which was taught later. It has no baptistry, as the doctrine of baptism for the dead was not yet practiced. The structure has two unique sets of pulpits, representing the Aaronic Priesthood and the Melchizedek Priesthood. Truman O. Angell recorded in his journal that about this time Frederick G. Williams, one of Smith's counselors in the church's First Presidency, came into the temple during construction and related the following:

Following Smith's death and the associated succession crisis, Angell continued as the LDS Church's architect, designing the Salt Lake Temple, Lion House, Beehive House, Utah Territorial Statehouse, St. George Temple, and many other public buildings.

The sandstone used to build the temple was quarried from south of the temple. Native timbers were cut from the surrounding forests. The Temple, begun in 1833 and dedicated in 1836, was one of the largest buildings in Northern Ohio. It is a combination of Greek, Georgian, Gothic, and Federalist architectural styles. The building has been designated a National Historical Landmark and has been recognized by the Architects Society of Ohio and the Ohio Historical Society.

The pulpits and the pews are among the distinctive features of the interior. Two sets of pulpits grace the main floor with another two sets on the second floor. The seats in the pew boxes are benches that can be shifted from the back to the front, thus making it possible for the congregation to face either the front or the rear pulpits.

The main floor of the Kirtland Temple was used for various services of worship, and the second floor was a school for the ministry. The third floor contained rooms for the "Kirtland High School" during the day and Church quorum meetings in the evening. The west third floor room was Smith's office.

Nauvoo Temple

Construction of the original Nauvoo Temple commenced April 6, 1841, and its final dedication was in May 1846. The temple was designed in the Greek Revival style by architect William Weeks, under the direction of Smith.  Weeks' design made use of sunstones, moonstones, and starstones. Some have thought these represented distinctively Latter-day Saint motifs, representing the Three Degrees of Glory in the LDS Church's conception of the afterlife (D&C 76: 70-81). The placement of the symbols on the building in descending order—starstones, sunstones, and moonstones—does not support the above assertion, but rather a reflection of Revelation 12:1.

Like Kirtland, the Nauvoo Temple contained two assembly halls, one on the first floor and one on the second, called the lower and upper courts. Both had classrooms and offices in the attic. Unlike Kirtland, the Nauvoo Temple had a full basement, which housed a baptismal font.

Basement
The basement of the Nauvoo Temple, used as the baptistery, contained a large baptismal font in the center of the main room. It originally featured a tongue and grooved white pine font, painted white. It was sixteen feet long, twelve feet wide, and four feet deep. This font was replaced with a limestone one after several years to better handle the water. Two railed stairways led to the font from the north and south sides. A well on the east side of the font provided the water supply.

Great Hall

A flight of eight broad steps led to a landing where two more steps entered three archways. These archways led to the vestibule, the formal entrance to the temple.

Two large double doors on the east wall opened to the first floor assembly hall of the lower court, known as the "Great Hall", which occupied the remainder of the floor space east of the vestibule. Two doors, one on the north wall and another on the south, opened to the landing of two spiral staircases, one in the northwest corner and the other in the southwest corner, which led to the attic. These were the only access points to the rest of the building. The room was flanked on either side by seven large, arched windows, with four similar windows along the east wall. The floor was stained wood and the walls were painted white.

One report stated that on the east wall of the vestibule was an entablature, similar to the one in the facade, which read in bright gilded letters, "THE HOUSE OF THE LORD – Built by The Church of Jesus Christ of Latter-Day Saints – Commenced April 6th, 1841 – HOLINESS TO THE LORD."

At the east and west ends of the hall were two sets of similar pulpits. They were arranged with four levels, the top three consisting of a group of three semi-circular stands. The lowest level was a drop table which was raised for use in the sacrament. The pulpits to the east, standing between the windows, were reserved for the Melchizedek Priesthood. Written in gilded letters along the arch of the ceiling, above the eastern pulpits, were the words "The Lord Has Seen Our Sacrifice – Come After Us." The pulpits to the west end were reserved for the Aaronic Priesthood.

The hall was fitted with enclosed pews with two aisles. The room could accommodate up to 3,500 people. Because there were pulpits on both ends of the room, the pews had movable backs which could be swung to face either direction, depending on who was presiding – the Melchizedek Priesthood or the Aaronic Priesthood. The first floor also included a mezzanine with fourteen small rooms.

Stairwells
The two stairwells were constructed of dressed limestone walls. One rose from the northwest corner and the other from the southwest corner of the temple. They were not true circles but were flattened on four sides. This was done to support landings and other support structures.

The staircases, made of wood, provided access to all levels of the temple, with a landing at each floor. The southwest staircase was completely finished, but the staircase in the northwest corner was never completed—it was roughed in with temporary boards resting on the risers. Workmen used this staircase to gain access to the building during its construction, especially during the winter of 1845–1846, when persons were using the other staircase to reach the attic for ordinance work.

Second floor assembly hall

The second floor hall was similar in construction to the Great Hall, except that it included the foyer area, the location of the vestibule. This made the room about seventeen feet longer than the Great Hall. A  stone arch ran north and south between the circular stairwells supporting the massive timbers for the tower above. The room had seven large windows along the north and south wide, with four windows along the east wall.

The floor would have had a similar configuration as the Great Hall with a set of double pulpits and pews, but the interior was never completed. The room was furnished with wooden benches for an occasional meeting. The second floor hall also included a mezzanine with fourteen small rooms.

Attic

At the top of the two stairways, opening to a foyer, was the attic floor. The attic was not built of limestone but of wood. The west end of the temple was a flat-roofed section that supported the tower. The rest of the attic was a pitched-roof section running the length of the temple. The area was illuminated by six windows along the foyer's west wall. Outside windows also provided light along the north and south sides. The roof had four octagonal skylight windows to provide light to the interior rooms, in addition to a twenty-foot arched window.

Tower rooms
Rising from the plateau of the attic is an octagonal tower. The tower was divided into three sections, each accessible by a series of stairways leading from the attic to an observation deck above. The lowest section was a belfry containing a bell, which was rung for various occasions. Between the observation deck and the belfry was a section containing the four clockwork mechanisms.

Reconstruction
In 1999, it was announced the temple would be rebuilt with the same exterior look of the original temple. On June 27, 2002, the Nauvoo Illinois Temple was dedicated. The limestone used for the original temple was quarried from a site just west of the temple. The stone for the new temple was quarried in Russellville, Alabama, a site chosen specifically because the stone best matched the original.

The reconstructed baptistry follows the original, with the addition of a metal lining to prevent deterioration and a platform where witnesses may sit. The floor of the baptistry, the largest of any temple in the church, was replicated in red brick tile. A dome and chandelier are featured in the ceiling and art glass window is on the east end. The room has intricate crown moldings. The window moldings included framework for six-pointed stars made of red, white, and blue glass to replicate the originals.

Castellated temples of Utah

St. George Utah Temple

The St. George Utah Temple (1), described as castellated Gothic style. has three ordinance rooms and eighteen sealing rooms.

The temple was originally patterned after the Kirtland and Nauvoo Temples, with two large assembly halls featuring a set of pulpits at each end. The lower hall was partitioned with screens for presentation of the endowment. It was extensively remodeled from 1937 to 1938, when the lower hall was permanently divided into five progressive-style endowment rooms.

About a year after the original dedication, a lightning storm caused extensive damage to the original tower. It was replaced with a taller, more majestic tower.

Following a second major renovation project in 1975, the progressive-style ordinance rooms were replaced with three motion-picture ordinance rooms. Live-acting endowment sessions were much longer and only three were performed a day. The film version allows for fourteen sessions a day.

Logan Utah Temple

The Logan Utah Temple (2) was the first temple to feature progressive-style ordinance rooms for presentation of the endowment ceremony. This design featured a room symbolizing each stage of man's progression: the Creation room, representing the events of Genesis; the Garden room represents the Garden of Eden, where Adam and Eve lived prior to the fall of man; the World room, where Adam and Eve lived after the fall; the Terrestrial room; and the Celestial room, representing heaven.

During the 1970s the interior of the temple was removed and only the exterior walls remain from the original construction. The two-year project replaced the progressive-style ordinance rooms with motion-picture ordinance rooms, constructed a new annex, and addressed many of the structural problems that the temple had developed. Spencer W. Kimball, the church president who rededicated the completed temple in 1979, regretted the need to reconstruct the interior of the temple because of the loss of pioneer craftsmanship.

The exterior walls of the Logan Utah Temple were originally painted a buff color to hide the dark, rough-hewn limestone. In the early 1900s, however, the paint was allowed to weather away, uncovering the stone that characterizes the temple today.

Manti Utah Temple

The Manti Utah Temple (3) is described as castellated style with influences of Gothic Revival, Neo-Renaissance, Second Empire and Colonial Revival architecture. The temple has four progressive-style ordinance rooms and eight sealing rooms. The ordinance rooms feature painted murals. the Creation Room mural is the oldest mural in any LDS temple. The murals from the Garden and World rooms were replaced in the 1940s due to extensive water damage. One of the more dramatic engineering marvels of the early Mormon pioneers are the open-center, self-supporting, spiral staircases located adjacent to the temple's west tower. The Manti Temple is one of two temples (Salt Lake being the other) where the endowment is still performed with live actors, rather than on film.

Salt Lake Temple

The Salt Lake Temple (4) is the most recognizable of all Latter-day Saint temples and is an international symbol of the church. (The Los Angeles California Temple was larger before the Salt Lake temple was expanded.) The first of the castellated temples to be started, it was the last to be completed, after 40 years of construction.
The building has six spires, suggestive of Gothic and other classical styles but unique, distinctive, and symbolic. It has four progressive-style ordinance rooms and fourteen sealing rooms.

The walls of the Salt Lake Temple are nine feet thick at the base and six feet thick at the top. It was the first temple to feature the prominent standing angel Moroni statue, which was created by Paris-trained sculptor Cyrus E. Dallin. Prior to that, the Nauvoo temple sported a flying angel weather vane. Of the dozen temples built from the construction of the Salt Lake Temple until the 1980s, only the Los Angeles California and the Washington DC temples had a similar statue. Moroni statues then became a standard part of nearly all LDS temples, and have been added to several temples originally built without them.

The angel Moroni depicts both a messenger of the restoration of the gospel and a herald of the Second Coming: "for the Son of Man shall come, and he shall send his angels before him with the great sound of a trumpet, and they shall gather together the remainder of his elect from the four winds" (JS-M 1:37).

The Salt Lake Temple features murals on the walls of its progressive-style ordinance rooms, excluding the Terrestrial room and Celestial room, which is adorned in an elaborate French Renaissance Revival style.

The east and west towers represent the Melchizedek and Aaronic Priesthoods, just as the east and west facing pulpits did in the Kirtland and Nauvoo assembly halls. Additional symbolism has been added to the towers. The east-facing towers represent the First Presidency of the Church, the highest office of the Melchizedek Priesthood. The west towers represent the Presiding Bishopric, the highest office of the Aaronic Priesthood. There are twelve pinnacles on each tower; the east pinnacles represent the office of the Twelve Apostles, and the west pinnacles represent the High Council.

Castle-like battlements surround the temple, symbolizing a separation from the world and a protection of the holy ordinances from the outside world.

At the base of each buttress is an earthstone. Earthstones represent the Earth, the "footstool of God". The Earth itself is in a telestial state, but will transition into a terrestrial state with the coming of the Millennium, and will finally receive Celestial glory at the end of the one thousand years.

Moonstones are located directly above the earthstones. Each moonstone is depicted in a different phase. The changing Moon represents the stages of human progression from birth and life to death and resurrection. It also represents one's journey from total darkness into the full light of Christ. Above the moonstones are sunstones, representing celestial glory.

Two cloudstones are carved on the east center tower, with descending rays of light. The original plan was to have one stone be white and the other black, with descending trumpets. The parallel of this symbolism is found in the Old Testament. Once temples were dedicated in ancient Israel, they were filled with the "cloud of the Lord." At Mount Sinai, the children of Israel saw this cloud as both dark and bright accompanied by the blasting of a trumpet.

Various starstones adorn the temple. Six-pointed stars represent the stars in the heaven. Inverted five-pointed stars represent morning stars, compared to the "sons of God" in the scriptures. The large upright five-pointed stars may represent the governing power of the priesthood, while the small upright five-pointed stars may represent the saving power of the priesthood for those who attach themselves to it.

The center west tower has a depiction of the Big Dipper constellation. This represents the method travelers have used for thousands of years to find the North Star. This symbolized the purpose of the temple in showing the way to God.

Each of the center towers features a pair of clasped right hands identified as the "right hands of fellowship" cited in Galatians 2:9. In Jeremiah 31:32, the Lord uses the handclasp to denote covenant making—an act at the very heart of temple worship.

Each of the center towers has a carved All Seeing Eye of God, which represents God's ability to see and know all things.

Temples with no spire

The construction of the Cardston Alberta Temple (6), on June 27, 1913, started two decades after the completion of the Salt Lake Temple. The temple at Cardston was the first design to be put out to bid to prominent architects, and the first to be designed without a priesthood assembly hall. This began a transition away from multi-purpose temples. The Cardston temple has  of floor space. It has four ordinance rooms and five sealing rooms.

The design of the Cardston Alberta Temple served as the basic pattern for the Laie Hawaii Temple (5), which was completed four years before the Cardston temple due to delays in Canada caused by World War I. Cardston was also the pattern for the third temple built after Salt Lake, the Mesa Arizona Temple (7). These three temples, the first built outside of Utah, are often described as having the style of Solomon's temple.

The Laie Temple is decorated with carved friezes. Each side depicts four dispensations of time: Old Testament Dispensation (west), New Testament Dispensation (south), Book of Mormon Dispensation (north), and Latter-day Dispensation (east).

It has four ordinance rooms and nine sealing rooms, expanded from the original four sealing rooms.

Modern center spire design

The Idaho Falls Idaho Temple (8) was the first temple designed with a central spire. This design represented a return to the use of spires, as the three previously dedicated temples featured no towers or spires. It has four progressive-style ordinance rooms and nine sealing rooms.

The Oakland California Temple (13) is an unusual variation on the center spire design because it incorporates four additional spires—one on each corner of the building—for a total of five. The center spire is the tallest. It is the only temple with five spires.

The trend continued with the Provo Utah Temple (15), and eight years later with the Jordan River Utah Temple (20).

Modern single-spire design

The first temple built in Europe was the Bern Switzerland Temple (9). Its distinctive design diverged from the Idaho Falls temple to one reminiscent of older temples like Kirtland and Nauvoo, but with a more contemporary design. This temple was designed to show a film of the presentation of the endowment, rather than live actors, to accommodate the many languages of Europe. Originally built with one ordinance room and three sealing rooms, the temple was remodeled in 1992 to update of the interiors and add ordinance and sealing rooms. The temple now has four ordinance rooms and seven sealing rooms. In 2005, an angel Moroni statue was added to the spire in commemoration of the temple's 50th anniversary.

Los Angeles California Temple

The Los Angeles California Temple (10), the largest temple built by the church, was dedicated in 1956. It is now second to the Salt Lake temple in size due to renovations that expanded the flagship structure. It was the first temple since Salt Lake to have a priesthood assembly room, added to the plans when World War II delayed construction. It would be the last temple designed for a live-actor presentation of the endowment. The ordinance rooms are filled with murals, and is one of only three temples with murals in the Celestial Room (the others being the Idaho Falls Temple and the Nauvoo Illinois Temple).

When the statue of Moroni was installed, it faced southeast (as does the temple), but was shortly turned to face due east at the request of church president David O. McKay. In 2003, the temple was changed to a progressive-style presentation, with a newly renovated Terrestrial Room. The endowment was still presented on film. In November 2005 the temple was closed for a seismic overhaul and a renovation of the baptistery, which had drainage and mildew problems. It reopened July 11, 2006, fifty years after the original dedication.

In addition to the Celestial room, the temple has four ordinance rooms (Creation room, Garden room, World room, Terrestrial room), and ten sealing rooms.

Following the basic design of the Bern temple, the Hamilton New Zealand Temple (11) was dedicated in 1958. It was built, along with the Church College of New Zealand, entirely by volunteer missionary labor, and was the first temple of the church in the southern hemisphere. It has one ordinance room and three sealing rooms.

London England Temple

The London England Temple (12), dedicated in 1958, follows the same basic pattern of the Bern and Hamilton temples. The temple was renovated in 1992 to include four ordinance rooms and seven sealing rooms.

The next temple to incorporate this style would be built in 1980. Unlike the other temples, the Seattle Washington Temple (19) was designed from the beginning to have four ordinance rooms and twelve sealing rooms.

Ten years later the church built four temples, similar in style, based on the single-spire design. These temples all have four ordinance rooms and four sealing rooms. The other temples are the Preston England Temple (52), built in 1998, and the unique Santo Domingo Dominican Republic Temple (99), built in 2000.

Lawsuits arguing that the Dover Amendment unfairly discriminates against non-religious groups delayed the addition of the spire of the Boston temple by several years as the courts decided whether the spire was a required element of the design of the temple. In support of the Dover Amendment, which exempts religious structures from local zoning laws, the court continually sided with the church. Chief Justice Margaret H. Marshall wrote in the 17-page ruling, "A rose window at Notre Dame Cathedral, a balcony at St. Peter's Basilica, are judges to decide whether these architectural elements are 'necessary' to the faith served by those buildings?"

Some recently constructed temples have returned to this earlier style, with two floors and a smaller building, with fewer ordinance and sealing rooms.

Small modern single-spire design

In the mid-1970s, beginning with the São Paulo Brazil Temple (17) and the Tokyo Japan Temple (18), the church designed temples based on a more chapel-like design: square buildings with a smaller spire. These first two temples had two ordinance rooms, but because there was no set plan during this time, the temples have four and five sealing rooms, respectively.

Shortly after these temples were built the church built a larger version: the Atlanta Georgia Temple (21). Later the church would repeat this pattern with two similar temples: the Denver Colorado Temple (40) and the much larger Toronto Ontario Temple (44), each with six sealing rooms.

The Apia Samoa Temple (22) was built at this time, but during a renovation, the building caught fire and was destroyed. It was immediately rebuilt with a larger design, but still with a single spire.

Similar two ordinance room temples are the Nuku'alofa Tonga Temple (23) and the Santiago Chile Temple (24), with three sealing rooms, and the Papeete Tahiti Temple (25) and the Sydney Australia Temple (28), with two ordinance rooms.

Freiberg Germany Temple

Located in Freiberg, Saxony, Germany, the Freiberg Germany Temple (33) was announced in October 1982, ground was broken for construction on April 23, 1983, and the temple was dedicated in 1985. Built in what was then the German Democratic Republic, the Freiberg Germany Temple is the only LDS temple to have been built in a communist state.

The East German government approved the building of the temple on practical grounds, because of the many Latter-day Saints requesting visas to travel to Switzerland, the location of the Bern Switzerland Temple. The government wished to minimize citizens' travel outside the country.

The temple was built on a very small scale, with no outward adornment of any kind. No oxen were used in the baptistery and only the bare minimum functional details were allowed inside.

After German reunification in 1990, Germany became the first country outside of North America to have more than one temple, this and the Frankfurt Germany Temple.

Political changes in Germany allowed for renovation of the temple from 2001 to 2002 to the high standards of temples built today. Additional square footage extending to the east approximately doubled the size of the temple. New amenities include the installation of twelve oxen to support the baptismal font, a non-patrons waiting room, a matron/brides room, and an office for the temple president. On December 20, 2001, an angel Moroni was placed atop the temple.

Six spire sloped roof
The first temple built in the six-spire sloped roof style was the Boise Idaho Temple, the design of which started after its announcement on March 31, 1982. Early examples of this design proved inadequate: Boise, Dallas, and Chicago were closed for extensive renovations not long after opening. These renovations restructured rooms, added facilities, and made other enhancements that significantly improved the buildings. The last temple built in this style was the Las Vegas Nevada Temple, which was completed in 1989. This style was then largely replaced by the classic modern, single-spire design. The unifying concept behind this style was the six spires and the sloped roof. Other than those factors, the temples varied widely in size and capacity, as illustrated in the table below:

Classic modern, single-spire design
The classic modern, single-spire design heralded an era where the temples square off the roof and return to a single spire design. All of the temples built in this style were dedicated between 1994 and 1999, with the exception of the Campinas Brazil Temple, which was not dedicated until 2002.

Smaller temple design
In October 1997, church president Gordon B. Hinckley announced a plan to build smaller temples that would provide the same functionality, but would be built in areas not typically suited for the larger temples the church had been building. The temples were built next to existing chapels to share both office space and parking facilities. Along with the lack of offices, these temples have no laundry facilities or waiting rooms and have small changing rooms. The design has  of space and includes a single ordinance room that acts as the Creation Room, Garden Room, World Room, and Terrestrial Room, leading to the adjacent Celestial Room. A sealing room and small baptistry are also included.

The Monticello Utah Temple (53) was the first of this new generation of smaller temples completed, opening in July 1998. It was subsequently followed in 1999 by the Anchorage Alaska Temple (54) in January and the Colonia Juárez Chihuahua México Temple (55) in March. The size proved to be inadequate for Monticello and Anchorage, so  were added, first for Monticello in 2002 and for Anchorage in 2004. The Colonia Juárez Temple has not been altered from the original design and remains the smallest temple built by the church.

Identical design

In April 1998, just six months following announcement of the intent to build the smaller temples, Hinckley announced plans to immediately begin construction of 32 more temples, with details to come later after consideration of needs, with a goal of having 100 temples in operation by the year 2000. This announcement kicked off an aggressive building cycle, using relatively identical models and floorplans. Described as a "classic modern, single-spire design," these temples have two progressive ordinance rooms and two sealing rooms. The exteriors have slightly different finishes. Most are granite or marble quarried from regional quarries such as Imperial Danby White variegated marble quarried from Vermont, which was used in many temples in the United States. The temples built in Australia and Fiji used granite imported from Italy. Other than minor variations in finish, landscaping, and setting, these temples are virtually identical. 38 temples were built between 1999 and 2003 using this design. The Columbus Ohio Temple was the first temple using this design to be identified, just a few weeks following Hinckley's initial announcement. With its dedication in August 1999, the Spokane Washington Temple was the first of this design to be completed.

List of identical temples

Variations in design
Occasionally the church would change the design slightly adding or removing square footage, but keeping the general design the same, with two ordinance rooms and two sealing rooms. Other temples have distinct modifications to their exteriors and size.

Additional sealing room
The church built several temples based on the two ordinance room plan, but added more square footage to accommodate an additional sealing room. These temples vary in size and style, although some look similar to the original design. Often plans were modified because local residents balked at the idea of such a large temple in their neighborhood. For example, the Sacramento temple was originally designed to be a much larger structure, but because of opposition, the design was changed to model the Newport Beach temple design.

The temples vary in size.

Other styles

Washington D.C. Temple

The Washington D.C. Temple (16), located in Kensington, Maryland, was the first temple built on the east coast of the United States. It was built with a modern six-spire design, with the three towers to the east representing the Melchizedek Priesthood leadership, and the three towers to the west representing the Aaronic Priesthood leadership.

A very large plot of land on a wooded hill was bought in 1962 and eleven acres were cleared for the temple. The rest of the land was left untouched to give the temple a remote feeling. The temple was designed to be similar in style and form to the Salt Lake Temple so that it would be easily recognized as a temple of The Church of Jesus Christ of Latter-day Saints. Although the temple appears to not have any windows, from the inside the thinly cut marble appears translucent. It holds six ordinance rooms and fourteen sealing rooms.

México City México Temple

The México City México Temple (26) is located in the northeastern part of the Mexican capital, Mexico City. It is heavily influenced by Mayan Revival architecture, with Aztec and Mayan elements, but is still similar to the center spire design. It is the largest temple outside the United States.

It was the first of twelve Latter-day Saint temples built in Mexico.

San Diego California Temple

The San Diego California Temple (45) is located in the La Jolla district of San Diego. It was built with two main spires, but unique to this temple are four smaller spires at the base of each main spire. The East spire is topped with the angel Moroni, which adorns most LDS temples.

The exterior finish is marble chips in plaster, giving the building a bright white glow. Just off Interstate 5, the temple is a major landmark when traveling the highway toward or away from San Diego. The temple is brightly illuminated at night.

Hong Kong China Temple

The Hong Kong China Temple (48) was built on the site of an existing mission home and meetinghouse. Because of the cramped situation of Hong Kong, the temple had to be built up instead of spreading out, a situation which contributed to the temple's unique design. The six-story building is designed to house not only the temple, but also a chapel, mission offices, and living quarters for the temple president and several missionaries. This is similar to the Manhattan New York Temple, which was adapted from an existing building.

Adapted buildings

Vernal Utah Temple

Originally, the Vernal Utah Temple (51) served as the Uintah Stake Tabernacle for Latter-day Saints in eastern Utah. The Tabernacle's foundation was constructed of nearby sandstone, with walls built of four layers of fired brick from local clay. Constructed using considerable donated labor from the fall of 1899, it was dedicated on August 24, 1907, by LDS Church president Joseph F. Smith. Smith reportedly said he would not be surprised if a temple was built there some day.

Roger Jackson characterized the Uintah Stake Tabernacle as relatively modest, without the decorative details found on tabernacles in central and northern Utah. Nonetheless, he wrote, "the building is the most prominent structure in Vernal and considered the finest building in all of eastern Utah." The tabernacle was superseded by an adjacent, more modern LDS stake center in 1948. Only used irregularly thereafter, the LDS Church announced the tabernacle's closing in 1984 for public safety reasons. Among other things, the tabernacle lacked indoor bathrooms and access for the disabled.

A local "Save the Tabernacle" committee formed, and in 1989 a preservation study was prepared. The LDS Church opted to turn the building into one of its new smaller temples, and plans were announced in 1994. In addition to preserving the exterior, bringing the building up to code, and altering the floor plan, the eastern spire of the temple was elongated to make it taller than the spire of the neighboring stake center. An east-facing golden statue of angel Moroni was placed on top of the spire. When discussing the problems involved with converting the old, deteriorated building into an acceptable modern temple, LDS Church president Gordon B. Hinckley remarked that the church would never attempt that again.

Copenhagen Denmark Temple

The Copenhagen Denmark Temple (118) is a renovation of an existing building, the Priorvej Chapel. This chapel was built by LDS members in 1931 and was dedicated by John A. Widtsoe, a member of the Quorum of the Twelve Apostles. It was built in the Neo-classical style, with columns in the front. Most of the renovation of the building was done on the inside. The Church wanted the structure to keep its original exterior appearance.

The day the chapel was dedicated, June 14, was the eighty-first anniversary of the day that the first Mormon missionaries arrived in Denmark. During World War II the chapel was used as a bomb shelter, but the building survived the war with little damage. After World War II the chapel was remodeled to hold more classrooms for the growing membership.

Manhattan New York Temple
The Manhattan New York Temple (119) was adapted from an existing stake center building—which stands at the intersection of West 65th Street, Broadway, and Columbus Avenue, and is across the street from the Lincoln Center—into the temple. The original building was dedicated by Spencer W. Kimball in May 1975 and houses a public affairs office on the second floor and a chapel on the third floor.

The temple occupies parts of the first floor and all of the fourth, fifth, and sixth floors of the building. The interiors of these floors were completely renovated. The walls were soundproofed so traffic noise would not interrupt temple patrons. Unlike many of the smaller temples built since the pilot program, the ordinance rooms are perpendicular to each other to adapt to the size limitations of the building. The cornerstone containing the year of dedication, commonly found on the outside facade of most temples, is located in the interior lobby next to the elevator which leads to the chapel portion of the building. Inside the temple, beehives are carved into the molding, and door handles that look like the Statue of Liberty torch are found throughout. Paintings on the walls of many of the rooms depict scenes from nature.

After the dedication, a special ceremony was held and a time capsule was placed in the cornerstone. Memorabilia such as a copy of the New York Times and LDS Church memorabilia such as a set of scriptures, a handkerchief used during the dedication ceremony, and sheet music, were placed inside. A steeple and statue of the angel Moroni would be added to the building in the fall. On October 9, 2004, thousands of people came to watch the ten-foot statue be placed on top of the steeple.

In a local church conference on November 12, 2006, it was officially announced that the fourth floor, which formerly housed classrooms and offices associated with the third-floor chapel and the old stake center, would be converted to become part of the temple. This construction was completed during the maintenance closing in August 2007. The temple baptistry continues to occupy part of the first floor of the building, and the rest of the temple occupies all of the fourth, fifth, and sixth floors. The third floor is a chapel for local congregations, and the second floor houses a public affairs office and a Family History Center. Clothing rental facilities are located on the fourth floor. The Family History Center that was located in the building prior to the construction of the temple was one of the most-used centers in the world.

Provo City Center Temple
On October 1, 2011, it was announced at the church's general conference that the Provo Tabernacle would be converted into Provo's second temple. Completed in 2016, the Provo City Center Temple utilizes much of the external shell of the tabernacle, all that remained of the original building after a fire in December 2010.

Neo-Classical temples
During a 2011 devotional at Brigham Young University - Idaho, Thomas E. Coburn, managing director of the LDS Church temple department, explained that church president Thomas S. Monson and the church's temple department were beginning to construct temples according to the "timeless" and classical designs of the cultures and people they will serve, citing the recently revealed architectural rendering of the Philadelphia Pennsylvania Temple as the first of many examples. This trend towards Neo-Classicism appears to be the latest in LDS Temple architecture. The Indianapolis Indiana Temple, with a central spire design reminiscent of downtown structures like the Indianapolis Soldiers' and Sailors' Monument or the Indiana World War Memorial Plaza, is another example.

See also

 Comparison of temples of The Church of Jesus Christ of Latter-day Saints
 List of temples of The Church of Jesus Christ of Latter-day Saints
 List of temples of The Church of Jesus Christ of Latter-day Saints by geographic region
 Temple (Latter Day Saints)
 Temple (LDS Church)
 The Church of Jesus Christ of Latter-day Saints
Mormonism and Freemasonry

References

Further reading
 C. Mark Hamilton "Nineteenth-Century Mormon Architecture and City Planning"
 
 
 
 Joseph Weston "Mormon Architecture"

External links

Architecture
Christian architecture